Kō Station may refer to either of the following railway stations in Japan:
 Kō Station (Aichi) on the Meitetsu Nagoya Main Line
 Kō Station (Tokushima) on the Tokushima Line